Realmonte (Sicilian: Muntiriali) is a comune (municipality) in the Region of Agrigento in the Italian Provence Sicily, located about  south of Palermo and about  west of Agrigento.

Realmonte borders the following municipalities: Agrigento, Porto Empedocle, Siculiana.

A tourist attraction in the town is the Scala dei Turchi.

The ancient Roman villa nearby with exquisite mosaics can be visited.

History 

The large and elaborate Roman villa of Realmonte (also called Durrueli) is located on the coast. In Roman times this would have represented the seat of a large estate or latifundia. Excavations have recently revealed more of the extent and history of the site.

It is not known when the municipality was founded, but its origins probably go back to the second half of the 17th century.

The Roman villa
The Roman villa was first discovered in 1907 consisting of two rooms with elaborate opus sectile in expensive coloured marbles and three rooms with mosaic floors dating from the 1st c. AD.

Further excavations in 1979-1985 brought to light and adjacent wing of the villa with the thermal baths, probably built in a later period in 2nd c. AD. The villa included a peristyle around a garden which included the impluvium, a large basin for collecting rainwater.

Excavations resumed in 2017 and revealed that the villa extended to an area of 5000 sq. m and was occupied until the 7th c. AD. It became a major industrial site producing tiles and pottery in the later period.

Twin towns
 
 Hornaing, France, since 2011
 Perm, Russia, since 2011
 Eppelborn, Germany, since 2013

References

Cities and towns in Sicily
Roman villas in Italy
Roman sites of Sicily